Robert Reid (1831 – 30 March 1875) was a Liberal Party politician.

He was elected Liberal MP for Kirkcaldy Burghs in 1874 but died less than a year into the role in 1875.

References

External links
 

Members of the Parliament of the United Kingdom for Fife constituencies
Scottish Liberal Party MPs
UK MPs 1874–1880
1831 births
1875 deaths